The 1957 Cornell Big Red football team was an American football team that represented Cornell University as a member of the Ivy League during the 1957 NCAA University Division football season. 

In its 11th season under head coach George K. James, the team compiled a 3–6 record and was outscored 159 to 100. Gerald Knapp was the team captain. 

Cornell's 3–4 conference record tied for fourth place in the Ivy League. The Big Red were outscored 111 to 87 by Ivy opponents. 

Cornell played its home games at Schoellkopf Field in Ithaca, New York.

Schedule

References

Cornell
Cornell Big Red football seasons
Cornell Big Red football